Hardie Clifford Parker (November 24, 1907 – January 27, 1968) was a Canadian politician. He served in the Legislative Assembly of New Brunswick as member of the Liberal party from 1944 to 1952.

References

1907 births
1968 deaths
New Brunswick Liberal Association MLAs